In anonymity networks (e.g., Tor, Crowds, Mixmaster, I2P, etc.), it is important to be able to measure quantitatively the guarantee that is given to the system. The degree of anonymity  is a device that was proposed at the 2002 Privacy Enhancing Technology (PET) conference. Two papers put forth the idea of using entropy as the basis for formally measuring anonymity: "Towards an Information Theoretic Metric for Anonymity", and "Towards Measuring Anonymity".



Background
Anonymity networks have been developed and many have introduced methods of proving the anonymity guarantees that are possible, originally with simple Chaum Mixes and Pool Mixes the size of the set of users was seen as the security that the system could provide to a user.  This had a number of problems; intuitively if the network is international then it is unlikely that a message that contains only Urdu came from the United States, and vice versa.  Information like this and via methods like the predecessor attack and intersection attack helps an attacker increase the probability that a user sent the message.

Example With Pool Mixes

This is in no way reflected in 's anonymity set, but should be taken into account in the analysis of the network.

Degree of Anonymity
,
Now the maximal entropy of a network occurs when there is uniform probability associated with each node  and this yields .
.
Using this anonymity systems can be compared and evaluated using a quantitatively analysis.

Definition of Attacker
These papers also served to give concise definitions of an attacker:
 Internal/External  an internal attacker controls nodes in the network, whereas an external can only compromise communication channels between nodes.
 Passive/Active  an active attacker can add, remove, and modify any messages, whereas a passive attacker can only listen to the messages.
 Local/Global  a local attacker has access to only part of the network, whereas a global can access the entire network.

Example 

Crowds
In Crowds there is a global probability of forwarding, which is the probability a node will forward the message internally instead of routing it to the final destination. Let there be  corrupt nodes and  total nodes. In Crowds the attacker is internal, passive, and local.

Onion routing
In onion routing let's assume the attacker can exclude a subset of the nodes from the network, then the entropy would easily be , where  is the size of the subset of non-excluded nodes.

Applications of this metric
In 2004, Diaz, Sassaman, and DeWitte presented an analysis of two anonymous remailers using the Serjantov and Danezis metric, showing one of them to provide zero anonymity under certain realistic conditions.

See also
 Onion routing
 Tor (anonymity network)
 Entropy
 Crowds

References
  See Towards Measuring Anonymity  
  See Towards an Information Theoretic Metric for Anonymity
  See Comparison Between Two Practical Mix Designs 

Anonymity networks
Computer network analysis
Cryptographic software
Internet privacy
Routing software